Jiří Grossmann (20 July 1941  – 5 December 1971) was a Czechoslovak theatre actor, poet, and composer.

Life
Grossmann was born in Prague. After his graduation, he started at the technical university ČVUT, but left in 1962 when he met Miloslav Šimek in the Olympik bar. Grossmann performed with Dixie Party Band in the Olympik bar, playing on contrabass also. They immediately established a theatre double and started writing poems, short-stories and stageplays. Their first theatre group was called Mlok. Grossmann and Šimek's most famous project was Navštěvní dny, a theatre-styled show performed in theatre Semafor.

The duo was persecuted after the Soviet occupation of Czechoslovakia in 1968 following the Prague Spring.

When Grossmann realized he was dying of Hodgkin's lymphoma, he wrote one of his most sad lyrics called "Závidím (I Am Envious)" expressing fears of death. A few days before Christmas in 1971, Grossmann died in the hospital.

The Jiří Grossmann Theatre and Prague's Jiří Grossmann's Archway commemorate him today.

Related quotes

Filmography

Short stories
Bolded names represent book collections.

Lyrics

Discography

References

External links
Who's Who At Libri

Supraphon Entry
Czechoslovak Film Database Entry
Jiří Grossmann On Broadcast

1941 births
1971 deaths
Czech male poets
Czech songwriters
Male actors from Prague
Czech Technical University in Prague alumni
Czech male stage actors
Czech male film actors
Czech male television actors
20th-century Czech poets
Czechoslovak male actors
Deaths from cancer in Czechoslovakia
Deaths from Hodgkin lymphoma
20th-century male writers